Cabin may refer to:

Buildings
 Beach cabin, a small wooden hut on a beach
 Log cabin, a house built from logs
 Cottage, a small house
 Chalet, a wooden mountain house with a sloping roof
 Cabin, small free-standing structures that serve as individual lodging spaces of a motel

Films

 The Cabin, 2018 Swedish-American horror film
 The Cabin Movie, 2005 Canadian comedy-drama film

Places
 Cabin, Shropshire, England
 Cabins, West Virginia, US
 Cabin Bluff, Georgia, in the List of places in Georgia (U.S. state) (A–D), US

Transportation
 Cabin (aircraft)
 Cabin (ship)
 Cabin (truck), an enclosed space where the driver is seated
 Cabin car or caboose, a crewed rail transport vehicle at the end of a freight train
 Cabin cruiser, a boat with enclosed accommodation
 Cabin motorcycle, a fully or semi-enclosed motorcycle

Other uses
 Cabin (Ferris wheel), a passenger compartment
 Cabin rights, an American frontier claim to land
 Cabin (band), an American indie rock band

See also
 
 
 Cab (disambiguation)
 Cabin boy (disambiguation)
 Cabin fever (disambiguation)